Salomè (also known as Salome) is a 1910 Italian short film directed and produced by Ugo Falena. The film stars  Vittoria Lepanto, Laura Orette and Ciro Galvani in the lead roles.

Cast
 Vittoria Lepanto
 Laura Orette
 Ciro Galvani
 Achille Vitti
 Francesca Bertini
 Gastone Monaldi

References

External links

 

1910 films
1910 short films
1910s Italian-language films
Films based on the Gospels
Films directed by Ugo Falena
Italian silent short films